"So Big" is a song performed by British Virgin Islands recording artist Iyaz. It is the third single released from his album titled Replay and follows his singles "Replay" and "Solo", both of which reached the top 3 of the UK Singles Chart. It released as an EP in the U.S. on 21 June 2010 with a single release in the UK on September 10, 2010. "So Big" is written and produced by J. R. Rotem. Claude Kelly is the additional co-writer and also provides vocal production.

Music video

The music video for "So Big" premiered on Iyaz's MySpace page on 5 August 2010 where it has received over 82,000 views. On 11 August 2010 it was added to his official YouTube account where it has currently amassed over 53 million views. American actress Francia Raisa is featured in the video.

Formats and track listings

UK digital single
 "So Big" (Album Version) – 3:19

UK digital remix single
 "So Big" – 3:19
 "So Big" (Jupiter Ace Remix) – 4:53
 "So Big" (BackBeet Remix Club 12) – 5:59
 "So Big" (BackBeet Radio Edit) – 3:15
 "So Big" (MoonRunners Remix) – 5:29

U.S. digital EP
 "So Big" – 3:19
 "Replay" (Donni Hotwheel Mixshow) – 5:22 
 "Look at Me Now" – 3:05 
 "Goodbye" – 3:22

Chart performance
In August 2010, "So Big" debuted at number 54 on the UK Singles Chart at 54 and peaked at 40, failing to reflect the success of "Replay" and "Solo" and it did not chart on any Billboard chart.

Release history

References

2010 singles
Song recordings produced by J. R. Rotem
Songs written by J. R. Rotem
Iyaz songs
Songs written by Claude Kelly
2009 songs